Ian Edward Wright  (born 3 November 1963) is an English television and radio personality and former professional footballer.

Wright enjoyed success with London clubs Crystal Palace and Arsenal as a forward, spending six years with the former and seven years with the latter. With Arsenal he lifted the Premier League title, both the major domestic cup competitions, and the European Cup Winners Cup. Known for his speed, agility, finishing and aggression, he played 581 league games, scoring 287 goals for seven clubs in Scotland and England, while also earning 33 caps for the England national team, and scoring nine international goals.

Wright also played in the Premier League for West Ham United, the Scottish Premier League for Celtic and the Football League for Burnley and Nottingham Forest. , he is Arsenal's second-highest scorer of all time and Crystal Palace's third-highest.

After retiring, he has been active in the media, usually in football-related TV and radio shows. Two of his sons, Bradley and Shaun, are retired professional footballers.

Early life
Wright is the third son of Jamaican parents. His father was absent from a young age, and he was brought up by his mother, Nesta, and an abusive stepfather.

Wright came to professional football relatively late. Despite having had trials at Southend United and Brighton & Hove Albion during his teens, he was unable to attract sufficient interest to win a professional contract offer. Reverting to playing for amateur and non-League teams, he was left disillusioned about his chances of a career as a professional footballer.

After a spell of poverty during which his wife was expecting their first child, Wright spent two weeks in Chelmsford Prison for failing to pay fines for driving without tax or insurance. He recalls that after being locked in the cell, he burst into tears and vowed to God to do everything in his power to make it as a footballer.

Wright described his teacher Sydney Pigden as "the first positive male figure that I had in my life".

Club career

Crystal Palace
From being a teenager, until the age of 21, Wright played for Bermondsey-based amateur Sunday league club Ten-em-Bee (a club his sons Brett and Shaun also later played for). In 1985 Wright was signed by semi-professional Greenwich Borough and got paid £30 a week.   After just six or seven matches, he was spotted by a Crystal Palace scout after a tip-off from Dulwich Hamlet manager Billy Smith and was invited for a trial at Selhurst Park. Having impressed then-manager Steve Coppell, he signed a professional contract for Crystal Palace in August 1985, just three months short of his 22nd birthday, the agreed fee being a set of weightlifting equipment.

He quickly made his mark in his first season, scoring nine goals to finish as Palace's second-highest scorer. When Mark Bright arrived on the Palace scene the following year the duo soon established a successful striking partnership and it was largely their goals which took the club back to the top flight via the playoffs in 1989. Wright was particularly instrumental that season, scoring 24 goals in the Second Division and a grand total of 33 in all competitions.

Wright was called up for England B duty in December 1989 but a twice-cracked shin bone reduced his initial impact in the First Division. However, after recovering from the injury he made a dramatic appearance as a 'super-sub', in the 1990 FA Cup Final against Manchester United. He equalised for Palace a few minutes after coming onto the field forcing extra time, then putting them ahead in extra time. The eventual score was 3–3, but Palace lost the replay 1–0.

The next season, he gained full international honours, and reached a hundred goals for Crystal Palace, as the club finished in their highest ever league position of third place in the top flight. He also scored twice as Palace beat Everton to win the Full Members Cup at Wembley. Wright became renowned for his deadly striking ability, as shown when he scored a hat-trick in just eighteen minutes in Palace's penultimate game of the 1990–91 season away to Wimbledon.

Wright scored 117 goals in 253 starts and 24 substitute appearances over six seasons for The Eagles in all competitions, making him the club's record post-war goalscorer and third on the all-time list.
In 2005, he was voted into their Centenary XI and was named as their "Player of The Century".

Arsenal
Wright signed for Arsenal in September 1991 for £2.5m, which at the time was a club record fee. He scored on his debut against Leicester City in a League Cup tie, produced a hat-trick on his league debut against Southampton, and in the final match of the season, scored another hat-trick against the Saints to take his total to 31 goals in all competitions. Wright's 29 league goals (24 for Arsenal, 5 for Palace) were enough to make him the league's top scorer. , only Wright and Teddy Sheringham have led the top-flight scoring charts having scored for two clubs during the season in question.

Wright went on to be the club's top scorer for six seasons in a row. He played a major part in the club's success during the 1990s, winning an FA Cup and League Cup double in 1993; scoring in both the FA Cup Final itself and the replay against Sheffield Wednesday. Wright also helped Arsenal reach the 1994 European Cup Winners' Cup Final, although he was suspended for the final in which Arsenal beat Parma 1–0.

Wright scored in every round but the final of Arsenal's 1995 Cup Winners' Cup runners-up campaign, and scored freely in the Premier League, but it was a difficult time for Arsenal following the dismissal of manager George Graham over illegal payments, and under caretaker Stewart Houston they could only manage a 12th-place finish in the league.

The arrival of Bruce Rioch heralded a bleaker time; the two did not get on and eventually Wright handed in a transfer request which he later retracted. The arrival of Dennis Bergkamp brought a brief but fruitful striking partnership: in their first season together they helped Arsenal finish fifth in the league and qualify for the UEFA Cup. They also reached the League Cup semi-finals, in which they lost on away goals to eventual winners Aston Villa.

By the time Arsène Wenger arrived at Arsenal in September 1996, Wright was nearly 33. Despite his age, he continued to score regularly, and was the second-highest Premier League scorer in the 1996–97 season with 23 goals. That season he also set a record by scoring against 17 of Arsenal's 19 opponents, a record for a 20 team Premier League season; scoring against every team but Sunderland and Manchester United. However this was equalled by Robin van Persie in 2012. On 13 September 1997, he broke Cliff Bastin's club record of 178 to become Arsenal's all-time top scorer with a hat-trick against Bolton Wanderers, and his memorable goal celebration saw him reveal a shirt with  "Just Done It" written on it. Wright's final goal at Highbury, on 4 October against Barnsley, was his 300th career goal for both Crystal Palace and Arsenal. He scored his final goal for the club on 6 January 1998 in a League Cup quarter-final victory against West Ham United at the Boleyn Ground. A hamstring injury ruled him out for much of the remainder of the season. In his absence, Arsenal were eliminated in the semi-final by Chelsea, ending their hopes of a domestic treble. He was an unused substitute as Arsenal won the 1998 FA Cup Final, and lifted his first Premier League title as the Gunners completed a league and cup double.

Wright scored 185 goals from 288 appearances (279 starts) for Arsenal, and scored eleven hat-tricks for them, a total surpassed only by Jimmy Brain and Jack Lambert. , he is Arsenal's second highest goalscorer of all time, behind Thierry Henry who broke his record in 2005. Wright placed fourth in a 2008 poll of fans conducted on the club's website to select the 50 Gunners Greatest Players.

Later career
In July 1998, Wright moved to West Ham United for £500,000. He spent fifteen months as a West Ham player, scoring the winner on his debut against Sheffield Wednesday, without reaching the same form he had at Arsenal. During his spell there he made headlines when he vandalised the referee's dressing room at Upton Park after being sent off during a match against Leeds United. He had subsequent short spells at Nottingham Forest, Celtic, and Burnley (whom he helped to promotion to Division One) before retiring in 2000.

Whilst at Celtic, Wright became involved in a campaign by some fans calling for the removal of manager, John Barnes. Celtic's performances had been poor and Wright, Barnes and Regi Blinker were considered by some to be not sufficiently talented to improve the club. Wright and Blinker were consequently abused by some Celtic fans. Wright said of the incidents, "I felt I was caught up in a war crisis in Kosovo not involved in a football result that wrecked John Barnes' career as Celtic manager. Some so-called fans, a few morons who know nothing better, covered my car in spit, they were shouting obscenities at myself and Regi Blinker." Wright scored on his debut for Celtic as he had for Nottingham Forest. He finished his club career with 313 goals in all competitions.

International career
Wright was overlooked for the 1990 World Cup but was handed his England debut by manager Graham Taylor in February 1991.
He started in the 2–0 victory against Cameroon at Wembley and helped England reach the finals of Euro 1992 in Sweden. Despite the fact that his international career spanned eight years, 87 matches and three full-time managers, he only started 17 times and was a used substitute in 16 matches.
In each of the seven seasons that followed the 1990 World Cup, Wright never scored fewer than 23 goals a season for his club. He scored 25 goals for Crystal Palace during the 1990–91 campaign
before going on to break the 30 club-goal barrier five times in the following six seasons.  Despite Wright's goalscoring feats, the highest number of games he started for England consecutively was three—something he only did twice.

Taylor, who became England manager after the 1990 World Cup in Italy and remained in charge for 38 matches, only handed Wright nine starts and seven substitute appearances. He opted instead to use a whole host of less prolific strikers, including Nigel Clough of Nottingham Forest, Paul Stewart of Tottenham Hotspur, David Hirst of Sheffield Wednesday and Brian Deane of Sheffield United. Wright did not make it into the squad for Euro 1992, with Clough, Gary Lineker of Tottenham Hotspur, Alan Shearer of Southampton and Arsenal teammates Alan Smith and Paul Merson preferred. This was particularly surprising as Wright had been the highest top division goalscorer in England that season.

Five of Wright's nine international goals were scored under Taylor's management; these included a vital late equaliser in a 1–1 away draw against Poland in May 1993 and four goals in the 7–1 away win against San Marino in Bologna, Italy, in November 1993, the final match of Taylor's reign as manager. Both matches were qualifiers for the 1994 World Cup in the US, for which England failed to qualify - missing out for the first time since 1978.

Terry Venables replaced Taylor as manager after the unsuccessful 1994 World Cup qualifying campaign but Wright's appearances in the side became even more limited. Despite featuring in four of the first five matches under Venables, albeit three times as a substitute, Wright never played under his management again. Ultimately, it cost Wright a place in the squad for Euro 1996, where England reached the semi-finals as the host nation. Venables vacated his position as England manager after the tournament and was replaced by Glenn Hoddle.

After being absent from international football for 21 consecutive matches, Wright was recalled to the England team by Hoddle in November 1996 when he came off the bench in a 2–0 1998 World Cup qualifying victory in Georgia. It had been over two years since Wright had made his previous England appearance in October 1994.

Four of Wright's nine international goals were scored under Hoddle's management, including the winner in a 2–1 friendly win against South Africa at Old Trafford in May 1997, and the opener a month later in a 2–0 victory over Italy in the Tournoi de France. England won the four-team tournament, staged as a warm-up event to the 1998 World Cup in France, which also included world champions Brazil as well as the hosts.

Wright went on to help England qualify for the 1998 World Cup by scoring two goals in the 4–0 qualifying campaign victory against Moldova at Wembley in September 1997, before producing arguably his best performance for his country in the vital 0–0 draw in Italy, a month later, which secured his country's passage through to the finals. He missed out on the finals through injury.

Following the 1998 World Cup, Wright went on to play a further two times for England as a West Ham United player. He came on as a substitute in the Euro 2000 qualifier in Luxembourg, a match England won 3–0 in October 1998. He made his final international appearance, a month later, in a friendly against the Czech Republic at Wembley. England won the match 2–0 and it also turned out to be Hoddle's final game as manager.

Wright started seven matches and was used as a substitute on six occasions under Hoddle, who was manager for 28 matches. He made his first appearance under Hoddle aged 33 and his final appearance under him aged 35. England went on to qualify for Euro 2000 in Belgium and the Netherlands, by which time, Wright was approaching his 37th birthday and retired from club football shortly after the tournament. Only Mick Channon played more times for England without being selected for a World Cup or European Championships squad. However, during Channon's England career, which spanned the years 1972–1977, England failed to qualify for either of these tournaments, while during Wright's they qualified for two European Championships and one World Cup.

Post-playing career

Ashford United
In March 2007, Wright was appointed Director of football strategy of Isthmian League team, Ashford Town, (now reformed as Ashford United) with him taking his place on the board of directors, following his purchase of a stake in the club.

Coaching career
On 18 May 2012, Wright was named as a first team coach at Milton Keynes Dons. He left the role in 2013.

Broadcasting career

Television
Wright began his television career as a guest host on Top of the Pops. He was later signed up by ITV to present his own chat show, Friday Night's All Wright, where he interviewed celebrities such as Elton John, Mariah Carey and Will Smith which ran for two seasons.

Since then, he has gone on to present programmes such as Friends Like These, I'd Do Anything, The National Lottery Wright Ticket and What Kids Really Think. He took over from David Seaman in Autumn 2004 as a team captain on BBC game show They Think It's All Over, which ran until 2006.

Wright has also starred in Men & Motors show Wright Across America, where he fulfils a lifelong dream to travel coast to coast across America on a Harley-Davidson motorbike, a show famous for Wright's rocky relationship with co-host and legendary custom bike builder Nicky Bootz.

He also starred in Ian Wright's Excellent Adventure in which he travels to Greenland with a friend, 'Mrs C' (Novello Noades, wife of former Crystal Palace chairman Ron Noades), to scale the highest mountain in the Arctic, Gunnbjørn.

Wright appeared as a "celebrity hijacker" in the television series Big Brother: Celebrity Hijack.

On 12 March 2008, Wright was confirmed as one of the presenters of the new series of the popular game show Gladiators.

Wright was a presenter on Channel 5's early evening magazine programme Live from Studio Five, from its launch in September 2009, to August 2010. He originally co-presented the show alongside, former model Melinda Messenger, and runner-up of The Apprentice, Kate Walsh.

After Messenger left, Wright continued to present the show, alongside Walsh, and new presenter Jayne Middlemiss. At the beginning of 12 August 2010 edition of Live from Studio Five, Walsh and Middlemiss announced that Wright would not be presenting the show that evening. At the end of the programme, they revealed that he had left the show, and would not be returning. Wright was also reported to be unhappy with other changes at the programme, such as its daily airtime being cut from 60 minutes to just 30 minutes.

During a radio interview with Absolute Radio, the day after he was axed, Wright stated that, "It's just been arguments for the last couple of weeks." Wright's contract was due to end in September 2010, but show bosses decided not to renew it. Wright made his final appearance on Wednesday 11 August's edition of Live from Studio Five. The show was axed in February 2011.

Wright presented Football Behind Bars, a reality TV series aired on Sky1 about his programme to socialise young men incarcerated at Portland Young Offenders Institution in Dorset by organising them in a football academy. The program was an experiment with the prison authority with an eye to expanding it to other prisons if it was successful. The series ran 6 episodes, aired weekly from 7 September to 12 October 2009.

Wright featured on an episode of BBC's 'Top Gear' in 2005, posting a 1.47.8 on the celebrity power lap times.

In November 2019, it was announced that Wright would be participating in the nineteenth series of I'm a Celebrity...Get Me Out of Here!.

In February 2021, it was announced that Wright would be hosting a new prime time game show for ITV called Moneyball.

Wright appears in the Apple TV+ series Ted Lasso, alongside Seema Jaswal as the co-host of the fictional sports show, "Forza Love of the Game."

Wright makes a number of appearances in the Amazon Original sports docuseries All or Nothing: Arsenal, which documented the club by spending time with the coaching staff and players behind the scenes both on and off the field throughout their 2021–22 season.

On 10 March 2023, Wright announced he would boycott the next broadcast of Match of the Day in solidarity with presenter Gary Lineker, who stepped back from his duties amid a row over comment criticising the government's immigration policies.

Radio
Wright formerly co-hosted the drivetime slot (4–7 pm) Monday to Thursday on Talksport, with Adrian Durham.
In 2010 Wright joined Absolute Radio, hosting Rock 'N' Roll Football, post match analysis and chat on Saturdays from 5 till 7.
In August 2013, he joined Kelly Cates as the Sunday co-presenter on BBC Radio 5's 606 football phone-in programme.

Punditry
Since his retirement from football, Wright appeared as a pundit on BBC Sport's International Match of the Day and has been a pundit for the 2002 and 2006 World Cups and Euro 2004.

On 17 April 2008, Wright quit his job on Match of the Day and criticised the programme for using him as a "comedy jester", saying "Fans want people who are dressed like them. They've got no one to relate to on TV and that's why I've said to them I don't want to do the England games any more."

In 2013, he joined BT Sport as a studio analyst for their coverage of the Premier League, FA Cup, UEFA Champions League and UEFA Europa League. Since 2014, Wright has also been a regular studio pundit, along with Lee Dixon, for all England matches on ITV, and was one of the main studio pundits for their coverage of 2014 FIFA World Cup and Euro 2016.

Wright left BT Sport in 2017 to increase his role at the BBC, regularly appearing on Match of the Day and Match of the Day 2, as well as continuing to co-host the 606 phone in show on Sunday evenings alongside Kelly Cates. Wright also now co-hosts 5 Live Sport on a Monday evening, alongside Mark Chapman on BBC Radio 5 Live. He also appears every Tuesday on The Debate on Sky Sports' Premier League channel, once again teaming up with Kelly Cates. Wright also appears regularly as one of the BBC's lead pundits for live games, regularly working with Gary Lineker and Alan Shearer.

Since October 2020, Wright has co-hosted his own podcast, Wrighty's House, on The Ringer FC, with a rotating panel of guests including Musa Okwonga, Ryan Hunn, Jeanette Kwakye, Flo Lloyd-Hughes, Carl Anka and Mayowa Quadri.

In 2020, Wright was named TV/Radio Pundit of the Year by the Football Supporters' Association. He won the award for a second time in 2022 as well as Pundit of the Year at the Broadcast Sports Awards and World Soccers Broadcaster of the Year.

Commercials

Wright has appeared in television commercials for the chicken sauce, Chicken Tonight, Nescafé and Ladbrokes along with Chris Kamara, Ally McCoist and former Arsenal teammate Lee Dixon. Wright appeared in an advertisement for the Wii console where he was seen playing Mario Strikers Charged and Wii Sports with his son Shaun. In his playing career, Wright was sponsored by the sportswear company Nike, and appeared in Nike commercials. In October 1992, Ian Wright featured on the first TV commercial for Nike in the UK, Nike "Kick it" was Nike first TV commercial for Football. In 1996, he starred in a Nike commercial titled "Good vs Evil" in a gladiatorial game set in a Roman amphitheatre. Appearing alongside football players from around the world, including Ronaldo, Eric Cantona, Luís Figo, Patrick Kluivert, Paolo Maldini and Jorge Campos, they defend "the beautiful game" against a team of demonic warriors, which culminates with Cantona striking the ball and destroying evil. In 1997 he starred in Nike's "Park Life" commercial (set to the tune "Parklife" by Blur) where a group of pub league players playing amateur football at Hackney Marshes in east London are suddenly joined by top Premier League footballers, including Wright, Cantona, David Seaman and Robbie Fowler. In 2000, "Park Life" was ranked number 15 in Channel 4's poll of the 100 Greatest TV Ads.

Writing
While he was still a professional footballer at Arsenal, Wright published his autobiography, Mr Wright. It was first published in hardback in 1996 by Collins Willow when Wright was still a professional player at Arsenal.

In 1993, Wright wrote and released a single,  "Do The Right Thing". The song was co-written and produced by Chris Lowe (of the Pet Shop Boys) and reached No. 43 in the UK Singles Chart.

Wright is also a columnist for tabloid newspaper The Sun.

In 2016, Wright wrote a new and updated version of his autobiography entitled A Life in Football, published by Constable.

In 2021, Wright co-wrote his first novel with Musa Okwonga, entitled Striking Out. The book is aimed at children and young people and is inspired by many issues that Wright himself dealt with while growing up as a young, black, working-class footballer in London.

Personal life
While young, Wright adopted the son of his then girlfriend Sharon Phillips (Shaun, born 1981) and had another child with her (Bradley, born 1985). They both went on to become professional footballers. He also had a son with another girlfriend. Shaun and Bradley have both played for the New York Red Bulls.

Wright's cousin Jermaine Wright is also a former footballer. Ian's nephew Drey Wright is also a footballer. Ian's grandson D'Margio Wright-Phillips (born 2001), plays for Stoke City.

Wright's cousin is actor Patrick Robinson, best known for playing Martin "Ash" Ashford in the long-running British medical drama series Casualty on BBC One.
 
In June 2014, whilst Wright was in Brazil working as a pundit for the 2014 FIFA World Cup, his wife Nancy was held at knifepoint as a gang burgled their family home, whilst their children were upstairs. Wright flew back to England but later returned to Brazil, where he was a pundit on ITV for the Cameroon-Brazil match.

Awards
Shortly after his retirement from playing in 2000, Wright was awarded an MBE for his services to football. This caused some surprise in view of Wright's poor disciplinary record. On 21 April 2022, Wright was inducted into the Premier League Hall of Fame.

Career statistics

Club

International

International goals

Honours
Crystal Palace
Football League Second Division play-offs: 1988–89
Full Members' Cup: 1990–91
FA Cup runner-up: 1989–90

Arsenal
Premier League: 1997–98
FA Cup: 1992–93, 1997–98
Football League Cup: 1992–93
European Cup Winners' Cup: 1993–94West Ham UnitedUEFA Intertoto Cup: 1999BurnleyFootball League Second Division runner-up: 1999–2000Individual'''
First Division Golden Boot: 1991–92
Arsenal Player of the Season: 1991−92, 1992−93
Crystal Palace Player of the Year: 1988–89
PFA Team of the Year: 1988–89 Second Division, 1992–93 Premier League, 1996–97 Premier League 
Premier League Player of the Month: November 1996
English Football Hall of Fame: 2005
Crystal Palace Centenary XI: 2005
BBC Goal of the Season: 1989–90
Crystal Palace Player of the Century
Member of the Order of the British Empire (MBE): 2000 New Years Honours List
Premier League Hall of Fame: 2022

References

External links

1963 births
Living people
English people of Jamaican descent
Black British sportsmen
Footballers from Woolwich
English footballers
Association football forwards
Greenwich Borough F.C. players
Crystal Palace F.C. players
Arsenal F.C. players
West Ham United F.C. players
Nottingham Forest F.C. players
Celtic F.C. players
Burnley F.C. players
Premier League players
English Football League players
Scottish Premier League players
First Division/Premier League top scorers
England B international footballers
England international footballers
English Football Hall of Fame inductees
Milton Keynes Dons F.C. non-playing staff
English television presenters
English radio personalities
Black British television personalities
English association football commentators
I'm a Celebrity...Get Me Out of Here! (British TV series) participants
Members of the Order of the British Empire
Association football coaches
Sportspeople convicted of crimes
Ian
FA Cup Final players
Premier League Hall of Fame inductees
Gladiators (1992 British TV series)